Yellow plum may refer to:

 Mirabelle plum, a yellow variety of plum associated with Lorraine in France
 Ximenia americana, a small sprawling tree of woodlands native to Australia and Asia whose fruits are sometimes called yellow plums